Eschscholzia lemmonii is a species of poppy known by the common name Lemmon's poppy.

It is endemic to California, where its distribution includes the Coast Ranges, Sierra Nevada foothills, and Transverse Ranges. One subspecies, the Tejon poppy, ssp. kernensis, is limited to the mountains of Kern County surrounding the Grapevine. This wildflower is an annual herb growing from a patch of segmented leaves made up of round-edged leaflets. The erect stalks grow up to 30 centimeters tall and bear orange or dark yellow poppy flowers. The fruit is a capsule 3 to 7 centimeters long containing tiny netted brown seeds.

References

External links
CalFlora Database: Eschscholzia lemmonii (Lemmon's poppy)
Jepson Manual (TJM2) eFlora treatment of Eschscholzia lemmonii
USDA Plants Profile for Eschscholzia lemmonii
UC Photos gallery — Eschscholzia lemmonii

lemmonii
Endemic flora of California
Natural history of the California chaparral and woodlands
Natural history of the California Coast Ranges
Natural history of the Central Valley (California)
Natural history of the Transverse Ranges
Natural history of Kern County, California
Flora without expected TNC conservation status